María Elena Romero (born 31 October 1972) is a Mexican diver. She competed at the 1992 Summer Olympics and the 1996 Summer Olympics.

References

External links
 

1972 births
Living people
Mexican female divers
Olympic divers of Mexico
Divers at the 1992 Summer Olympics
Divers at the 1996 Summer Olympics
Place of birth missing (living people)